The second UEFA Women's Cup took place during the 2002–03 season. It was won by Swedish Damallsvenskan side Umeå in a two-legged final against Fortuna Hjørring of Denmark.

First qualifying round

Second qualifying round

Group 1

Group 2

Group 3

Group 4

Group 5

Group 6

Group 7

Group 8

Quarter-finals

First Leg

Second Leg

Semi-finals

First Leg

Second Leg

Final

First Leg

Second Leg

Top goalscorers

External links
 2002–03 season at UEFA website
 UEFA Women's Cup results at RSSSF

Women's Cup
2002-03
UEFA
UEFA